Campana is a corregimiento in Capira District, Panamá Oeste Province, Panama with a population of 2,067 as of 2010. Its population as of 1990 was 1,363; its population as of 2000 was 1,692.

References

Corregimientos of Panamá Oeste Province